The 2021 season for  was the fifth season in the team's existence, all of which have been as a UCI WorldTeam. After just one year, British car manufacturer McLaren withdrew from its co-title sponsorship, citing a desire to "focus on motorsport after the uncertainty caused ... by the coronavirus pandemic." The team then took on the name of Victorious Stables, a horse racing stable owned by team owner Nasser bin Hamad Al Khalifa, with the adjective serving as "a constant reminder of [the team's] goal to achieve success at the highest level both on and off the bike."

Team roster 

Riders who joined the team for the 2021 season

Riders who left the team during or after the 2020 season

Season victories

National, Continental, and World Champions

Notes

References

External links 
 

Team Bahrain Victorious
2021
Team Bahrain Victorious